The 1879 Canterbury by-election was held on 8 May 1879.  The byelection was fought due to the resignation of the incumbent Conservative MP, Lewis Majendie.  It was won by the Conservative candidate Robert Peter Laurie.

Corruption 
The Liberal candidate Charles Edwards was accused of spending about £140 on buying votes during the campaign. Although Edwards disclaimed knowledge of this and blamed his campaign manager, he did admit that the money was spent on bribery.

References

1879 in England
History of Canterbury
1879 elections in the United Kingdom
By-elections to the Parliament of the United Kingdom in Kent constituencies
19th century in Kent